The 1995 Legg Mason Tennis Classic is a men's tennis tournament held in Washington, D.C. in the United States that was part of the Championship Series of the 1995 ATP Tour. The tournament was played on outdoor hard courts and was held from July 17 through July 24, 1995.

Andre Agassi won his 4th title of the year and 28th of his career. It was his 3rd win at the event, also winning in 1990 and 1991.

Finals

Singles

 Andre Agassi defeated  Stefan Edberg 6–4, 2–6, 7–5

Doubles

 Olivier Delaître /  Jeff Tarango defeated  Petr Korda /  Cyril Suk 4–6, 6–3, 6–2

References

External links
 ATP tournament profile

Legg Mason Tennis Classic
Washington Open (tennis)
1995 in sports in Washington, D.C.
1995 in American tennis